Badminton tournaments at the Deaflympics are organized since 1985.

Editions
 Badminton at the 1985 Summer Deaflympics (5)
 Badminton at the 1989 Summer Deaflympics (5)
 Badminton at the 1993 Summer Deaflympics (6)
 Badminton at the 1997 Summer Deaflympics (6)
 Badminton at the 2001 Summer Deaflympics (6)
 Badminton at the 2005 Summer Deaflympics (6)
 Badminton at the 2009 Summer Deaflympics (6)
 Badminton at the 2013 Summer Deaflympics (5)
 Badminton at the 2017 Summer Deaflympics (6)
 Badminton at the 2021 Summer Deaflympics (6)

Medalists

Medal table

References

External links
deaflympics.com
Results 1985
Results 2003
Results 2007

Badminton
Deaflympics
Recurring sporting events established in 1985